Dean Semler  ACS ASC (born 26 May 1943) is an Australian cinematographer and film director. Over his career, he has worked as a cinematographer, camera operator, director, second unit director, and assistant director. He is a three-time recipient of the AACTA Award for Best Cinematography and an Academy Award winner. He is a member of both the Australian Cinematographers Society (ACS) and the American Society of Cinematographers (ASC). In 2002 he was appointed a Member of the Order of Australia (AM).

Life and career

Early years
Semler was born in Renmark, South Australia. His first work in the production industry was as a camera operator at a local television station. Later, he began making documentary and educational films for Film Australia. He was the cinematographer for A Steam Train Passes (1974), Moving On (1974), Let the Balloon Go (1976), and A Good Thing Going (1978).

1980s
His first film was Stepping Out, in 1980. Allmovie praised his "stunning work" on the film Hoodwink (1981) with a screen play by Ken Quinnell. Semler was also the cinematographer for Mad Max 2 (1981). Semler's vast panoramic shots of the Australian Outback's deserts "...convincingly conveyed a parched, dusty, post-apocalyptic world" and led to international attention for his work. Semler also acted as cinematographer for the follow-up film to The Road Warrior, Mad Max Beyond Thunderdome (1985). Semler was also a cinematographer for the acclaimed Australian miniseries Bodyline (1984). In the late 1980s, Semler was the cinematographer for several popular films, such as Cocktail (1988) and Young Guns (1988).

1990s
In 1989, Semler was hired as cinematographer for Kevin Costner's Dances with Wolves (1990), for which he won an Academy Award for Best Cinematography. Semler lensed the comedy City Slickers (1991) and the action film Last Action Hero (1993) in the early 1990s. In 1995, Semler again worked with Costner on his film Waterworld.
In 1992 Semler was the cinematographer of The Power of One

2000s
In the 2000s, Semler was the cinematographer for a range of movies that included comedies (Nutty Professor II: The Klumps from 2000, and Bruce Almighty from 2003), action films (XXX from 2002 and The Alamo from 2004). In the mid-2000s, Semler was the cinematographer for the football comedy  The Longest Yard (2005) and Just My Luck (2006). In 2006, Semler worked with Mel Gibson again for the film Apocalypto. Semler's camera work conveyed the beauty of the lush Mesoamerican jungle setting in Apocalypto.

Filmography

Documentary film

Short film

Feature film

Other credits

Directing credits
 Firestorm (1998)
 The Patriot (1998)

Television
TV movie

TV series

Other credits

References

External links 
 

1943 births
Australian cinematographers
Australian film directors
Living people
People from Renmark, South Australia
Best Cinematographer Academy Award winners
Members of the Order of Australia